Amit Sharma (born 20 November 1974), is an Indian cricketer. He is a right-handed batsman and a right-arm offbreak bowler. Amit Sharma was considered as an allrounder and was the captain of the U-19 team that visited England in 1994 season and won the test series 1-0 that included a Test match century in the second game. The team lost 2–0 in the ODI series. Prominent members of the squad who made it to International cricket included VVS Laxman, Hrishikesh Kanitkar and Iqbal Siddiqui. The England team featured Marcus Trescothick, Michael Vaughan and Vikram Solanki in their squad.

Amit Sharma made his debut in Ranji Trophy domestic cricket in the 1992/93 season but never achieved his true potential. He never received an opportunity to play International Cricket and retired from domestic cricket after the 2003/04 season.

External links
 

Indian cricketers
Punjab, India cricketers
Himachal Pradesh cricketers
North Zone cricketers
1966 births
Living people